Dabhoi Junction railway station (station code: DB) is the main junction railway station in the Indian city of Dabhoi in Vadodara district, Gujarat, India. It falls under Western Railway's Vadodara railway division.

History

Dabhoi Junction railway station is at a distance of about 36 km from Vadodara. The station is about 150 years old and was once the largest narrow-gauge railway station in Asia. Although few narrow-gauge lines remain in India, because most have been converted to broad gauge, this is one of the remaining unchanged lines. Steam-powered trains for Miyagam Karjan, Chandod, Vadodara, etc., operate here.

There is little option for breakfast or lunch, since the station has only one tea/coffee stall. There is nothing to see except the oldest sheds and benches at the platform.

Trains
 12927/12928 Ekta Nagar - Dadar Superfast Express
 20903/20904 Ekta Nagar - Varanasi Mahamana Express
 20905/20906 Ekta Nagar - Rewa Mahamana Express
 20919/20920 Ekta Nagar - Chennai Central Superfast Express
 20945/20946 Ekta Nagar - Hazrat Nizamuddin Gujarat Sampark Kranti Express
 20947/20948 Ekta Nagar–Ahmedabad Jan Shatabdi Express
 20949/20950 Ekta Nagar–Ahmedabad Jan Shatabdi Express
 69201/69202 Ekta Nagar–Pratapnagar MEMU
 69203/69204 Ekta Nagar–Pratapnagar MEMU
 69205/69206 Ekta Nagar–Pratapnagar MEMU
 59117/18/19 Pratapnagar–Chhota Udaipur Passenger
 59121/22 Pratapnagar–Alirajpur Passenger
 79455/56 Vadodara–Chhota Udaipur DEMU

Electrification
The Pratapnagar–Dabhoi–Chhotaudepur line is now fully electrified. And Miyagam Karjan-Dabhoi gauge conversation + electrification works are done as on February 2023.

Now Pratapnagar–Dabhoi–Ektanagar (Kevadiya) line has been electrified. This new line was inaugurated on 17 January 2021.

Chhotaudepur–Alirajpur–Dhar new line + electrification work is in progress. It is expected to be completed in mid-2023.

See also
 Vadodara Junction railway station
 Pratapnagar railway station
 Chhota Udaipur railway station
 Bodeli railway station
 Ekta Nagar railway station

References

Railway stations in Vadodara district
Vadodara railway division
Divisions of Indian Railways
Transport in Vadodara
Railway junction stations in India
Railway stations in Gujarat